Bolt is a census-designated place (CDP) in Raleigh County, West Virginia, United States. Bolt has a post office with ZIP code 25817. As of the 2010 census, its population is 548.

History
A post office called Bolt has been in operation since 1902. One Mr. George Washington Bolt, an early postmaster, gave the community his last name.

Notable person
Little Jimmy Dickens, a country singer, was born at Bolt in 1920.

References

Census-designated places in Raleigh County, West Virginia
Census-designated places in West Virginia
Coal towns in West Virginia